Liostomia is a genus of sea snails, marine gastropod mollusks in the family Pyramidellidae, the pyrams and their allies.

Species
Species within the genus Liostomia include:
 Liostomia abreui Peñas, Rolán & Swinnen, 2015
 Liostomia afzelii Warén, 1991
 Liostomia beringensis Golikov & Kussakin, 1978
 Liostomia canaliculata Ortega & Gofas, 2019
 Liostomia clavula (Lovén, 1846)
 Liostomia clavuliformis Thiele, 1930
 Liostomia consobrina (Tate & May, 1900)
 Liostomia eburnea (Stimpson, 1851)
 Liostomia electa (Jeffreys, 1883) 
 Liostomia georgiana Pfeffer, 1886
 Liostomia hansgei Warén, 1991
 Liostomia mamoi Mifsud, 1993
 Liostomia minutissima Golikov in Golikov & Scarlato, 1967
 Liostomia rara (Thiele, 1925)
The following species were brought into synonymy:'''
 Liostomia afzelli Warén, 1991: synonym of Liostomia afzelii Warén, 1991
 Liostomia clavulus [sic]: synonym of Liostomia clavula (Lovén, 1846) (specific name incorrectly spelled)
 Liostomia wareni Schander, 1994: synonym of Odostomia wareni'' (Schander, 1994)

References

External links
 Monterosato, T. A. di. (1884). Nomenclatura generica e specifica di alcune conchiglie mediterranee. Virzi, printed for the Author, Palermo, 152 pp
 Iredale, T. (1915). Notes on the names of some British marine Mollusca. Proceedings of the Malacological Society of London. 11(6): 329-342
 To GenBank
 To ITIS
 To World Register of Marine Species

Pyramidellidae